Killing Time is a 1998 British crime film written by Neil Marshall and directed by Bharat Nalluri.

Plot

After the mobster who murdered his partner is acquitted, semi-corrupt detective Robert Bryant hires beautiful Italian female assassin Maria to kill the mobster. When Bryant discovers that he cannot afford Maria's services, he is forced to hire another assassin, Madison, to kill her. Maria survives and sets out to collect what's owed to her, one way or another. 
 
Most of the movie takes place in a hotel room where the criminals come one by one to kill off the hitwoman.

The hitwoman, in between taking a bath, listening to instructional tapes and listening to music, dispatches all the thugs one by one.

While the thugs sit around and wait to hear back from whichever one they've sent off to kill the hitwoman, the police officer Bryant and his partner investigate an antique store killing, which rapidly becomes a debate about character when Bryant's partner quickly figures out that Bryant is involved.

Cast
Craig Fairbrass as Det. Robert Bryant
Nigel Leach as Jacob Reilly
Kendra Torgan as Maria
Peter Harding as Madison
Rick Warden as Smithy

External links

References

1998 films
1998 crime thriller films
British crime thriller films
Films directed by Bharat Nalluri
Films scored by Alan Lazar
1990s English-language films
1990s British films